The Southern Texas PGA Championship is a golf tournament that is the championship of the Southern Texas section of the PGA of America. The Southern Texas section was formed in 1968, and the tournament has been played annually since that time. Tommy Aycock, who played in 51 PGA tournaments between 1970 and 1991, holds the record with six victories in this championship. Babe Hiskey (three-time PGA tour winner), Don Massengale (two-time PGA tour winner), and Butch Baird (two-time PGA tour winner) also have victories in this tournament.

Winners 

 2022 Steve Jurgensen
 2021 Ben Kern
 2020 Gilbert Mendez
 2019 Jared Jones
 2018 Omar Uresti
 2017 Jesse Droemer
 2016 Casey Russell
 2015 Omar Uresti
 2014 Ryan Polzin
 2013 David Von Hoffmann
 2012 Clayton Wonnell
 2011 Lonny Alexander
 2010 Brad Lardon
 2009 Tim Thelen
 2008 Tim Thelen
 2007 Lonny Alexander
 2006 Brad Lardon
 2005 David Lundstrom
 2004 David Lundstrom
 2003 David Lundstrom
 2002 Robert Thompson
 2001 Tim Thelen
 2000 Robert Thompson
 1999 Robert Thompson
 1998 Ken Kelley
 1997 Robert Thompson
 1996 Matt Swanson
 1995 Kirk Johnson
 1994 Steve Veriato
 1993 J. L. Lewis
 1992 J. L. Lewis
 1991 Tommy Aycock
 1990 Brent Buckman
 1989 Charlie Epps
 1988 Steve Veriato
 1987 Steve Veriato
 1986 Robert Thompson
 1985 Randy Petri
 1984 Charlie Epps
 1983 Babe Hiskey
 1982 Frank Conner
 1981 Tommy Aycock
 1980 David Lundstrom
 1979 Charlie Epps
 1978 Frank Conner
 1977 Bob Payne
 1976 Tommy Aycock
 1975 Don Massengale
 1974 Tommy Aycock
 1973 Tommy Aycock
 1972 Earl Jacobsen
 1971 Buddy Weaver
 1970 Babe Hiskey
 1969 Tommy Aycock
 1968 Butch Baird

References

External links 
PGA of America – Southern Texas section

Golf in Texas
PGA of America sectional tournaments
Recurring sporting events established in 1968